The epithet "the Drunkard" may refer to:

 Bekri Mustafa Pasha (died 1690), Grand Vizier of the Ottoman Empire
 Michael III (839 or 840–867), Byzantine emperor
 Selim II (1524–1574), Sultan of the Ottoman Empire
 Wenceslaus IV of Bohemia (1361–1419), King of Bohemia and King of the Romans sometimes called "the Drunkard"

Lists of people by epithet